Pavel Suchkov (born 21 November 1992) is a Russian ice hockey goaltender. He is currently playing with Berkut Karagandy of the Kazakhstan Hockey Championship (KHC).

Suchkov made his Kontinental Hockey League (KHL) debut playing with HC Spartak Moscow during the 2012–13 KHL season.

References

External links

1992 births
Living people
HC Spartak Moscow players
Russian ice hockey goaltenders
Ice hockey people from Moscow